Dibu 3: La gran aventura  (English language: Dibu 3: The Great Adventure) is a 2002 Argentine family adventure film incorporating animated figures directed by Raúl Rodríguez Peila. The film is based on a book by Enrique Silberstein and premiered on 18 July 2002 in Buenos Aires.

Plot

Reception
The film earned a total cinema gross of $240,792 and took $19,262 on its first weekend, shown at 32 cinemas across Argentina. The film was nominated for a Silver Condor Award for Best Animated Film in 2003.

Main cast
 Alejandro Awada ....  Professor Doxon
 Germán Kraus ....  José "Pepe" Medina
 Stella Maris Closas ....  Marcela Medina
 Alberto Anchart ....  Atilio
 Paula Siero ....  Ingeniera Ramos
 Rodrigo Noya ....  Martín
 Daniel Valenzuela ....  Agente Side
 Marcelo Alfaro ....  General
 Alejandro Muller ....  Técnico
 Cecilia Gispert ....  Dibu (voz)
 Laura Sordi ....  Buji (voz)
 Edgardo Moreira ....  Presidente
 Tito Lorefice ....  Drom (voz)
 Lucila Gómez ....  Grumi (voz)
 Gabriel Molinelli ....  Astronauta Jefe
 Adrián Loffi ....  Astronauta 2
 Camila MacLennan ....  Mujer assistante
 Pablo Marteletti ....  Radioactivo 1
 Alfredo Aguirre ....  Radioactivo 2
 Hernán Jiménez ....  Batman
 Martín Dahab ....  Malabarista
 Hernán Gómez ....  Lanzallamas
 Camila Dángelo ....  Niña intellectual
 Carlos Kaspar ....  Sabio 1/Presidente
 Rufino Gallo ....  Sabio 2/Presidente
 Tony Middleton ....  Presidente de los EE.UU.
 Luciana Godoy ....  Receta de Cocina

See also
 List of animated feature-length films
 Dibu

External links
 

2002 films
2002 animated films
2002 drama films
Films distributed by Disney
Argentine animated films
2000s Spanish-language films
Argentine fantasy adventure films
Films with live action and animation
2000s children's animated films
2000s Argentine films